16th: That's J-pop is the 16th studio album by the Japanese girl group Morning Musume '21. It was released in Japan on March 31, 2021.

Background 
It is the first album to feature 15th generation members Rio Kitagawa, Homare Okamura and Mei Yamazaki and the last album to feature 10th generation member Masaki Satō, 13th generation member Kaede Kaga, and 14th generation member Chisaki Morito.

The album was released in two versions: Limited Edition (CD+DVD) and Regular Edition (CD). The Limited Edition includes a Blu-ray recording of a no audience live titled "Morning Musume '21 Mukankyaku Secret Live", and an interview of the members talking about the album.

Featured lineup 

 9th generation: Mizuki Fukumura, Erina Ikuta
 10th generation: Ayumi Ishida, Masaki Sato
 11th generation: Sakura Oda
 12th generation: Miki Nonaka, Maria Makino, Akane Haga
 13th generation: Kaede Kaga, Reina Yokoyama
 14th generation: Chisaki Morito
 15th generation: Rio Kitagawa, Homare Okamura, Mei Yamazaki

Track listing 
All tracks are written by Tsunku except #13 and #14.

Rank and sales

References 

Morning Musume albums
2021 albums
Zetima albums
Japanese-language albums
Albums produced by Tsunku
Dance-pop albums by Japanese artists
Electropop albums